There are more than 120 affiliates of the Guru Gobind Singh Indraprastha University, also known as Indraprastha University (IP), which are run according to the rules and regulation set by the university.

Listed here are the 14 main colleges (university schools) and notable IP-affiliated government and private institutions.

University schools 
Guru Gobind Singh Indraprastha University has 14 university schools (colleges), 12 of them are on the main campus in Dwarka and 2 colleges, USAR and USDI are on the new campus at East Delhi.
 University School of Architecture and Planning
 University School of Automation and Robotics
 University School of Basic & Applied Sciences
 University School of Biotechnology
 University School of Chemical Technology
 University School of Design & Innovation
 University School of Environment Management
 University School of Humanities & Social Sciences
 University School of Information and Communication Technology
 University School of Law and Legal Studies
 University School of Management Studies
 University School of Mass Communication
 University School of Medicine and Para-Medical Health Sciences

Affiliated government institutions 
 Ch. Brahm Prakash Ayurved Charak Sansthan, Najafgarh
 Bhai Parmanand Institute of Business Studies
 C-DAC under Govt. of India
 Delhi Institute of Heritage Research & Management
 Delhi Institute of Tool Engineering
 Govind Ballabh Pant Engineering College
 National Power Training Institute, Badarpur, New Delhi
 Vardhman Mahavir Medical College and Safdarjung Hospital

Private colleges and institutes

References

External links
 Guru Gobind Singh Indraprasth University

Courses and colleges
Lists of buildings and structures in Delhi
GGSIPU